Daniel "Rover" Singer (born 1959) is an American actor, director, and stage writer known for The Complete Works of William Shakespeare (Abridged) (2000), The Inspector Lynley Mysteries (2001) and A Ballad for Tex (2014).

Career
At the age of 18, Singer co-founded the General Amazement Theater in Santa Rosa, California, which produced three musicals in its first and only season, including Singer's original adaptation of Alice in Wonderland. Upon his return from studying drama in London, he co-founded the Reduced Shakespeare Company, whose three-man farce The Complete Works of William Shakespeare (Abridged) has been performed around the world, including nine years in London's West End.

References

External links

 
 The Complete Works of William Shakespeare (Abridged) from The London Theatre Guide
 Biographies from the Past from The Reduced Shakespeare Company
 Rozwell – The Musical Legend

1959 births
Living people
American male stage actors
American male television actors
Male actors from Santa Rosa, California
Place of birth missing (living people)